Mae Fah Luang University (MFU), situated in Chiang Rai Province in northern Thailand, is named after the Princess Mother (Somdet Yah), Mae Fah Luang was the name given to her by the local people in Chiang Rai.
It is an autonomous public university that was established under the Royal Charter, in 1998. The university is also known as an international university in Thailand. Mae Fah Luang University was ranked 1st in Thailand by Times Higher Education in 2021.

 
All of its programmes are taught in English. It now has 11 schools namely, the School of Science, School of Liberal Arts, School of Management, School of Law, School of Medicine, School of Agro-Industry, School of Information Technology, School of Cosmetic Science, School of Health Science, School of Nursing and School of Anti-Ageing and Regenerative Medicine and in 2012 offers over 72 programmes such as: Biotechnology, Cosmetic Science, Engineering, Aviation Business Management, Agro-Industry, Medicine and many more. The university hospital has been completed, and was formally opened in September 2012. The School of Medicine has also been established and began offering M.D. degrees in the 2013 Academic Year.

International courses offered by the university include majors in Business and Thai Language and Culture, but all courses offered by the university are open to international students.

The campus is situated in Tambon Tasood, Mueang District and consists mainly of hills with only a small area of plain. Construction took many years, as the campus was mostly built on hillsides. Expansion work still continues.

The university uses English as the primary medium of instruction for the majority of its courses and has many native English-speaking lecturers in a wide range of disciplines. Mae Fah Luang University is a relatively new university and benefits from this by being able to offer modern courses relevant to today's world. The People's Republic of China built the Sirindhorn Chinese Language and Cultural Center on the campus as a gift to Thailand, equipping it with computers with Chinese programs and Chinese textbooks. The center is built to resemble a traditional Chinese house, complete with courtyards, gardens, and a pond. The Confucius Institute is also located here. In the 2012-2013 Academic Year over 10,000 students were enrolled at the university. Mae Fah Luang University was ranked 1st in Thailand by Time Higher Education in 2020

History
Mae Fah Luang University (MFU) was established as an autonomous public university, under the Royal Charter, in 1998, with support from the Royal Thai Government. The University was established to meet the needs of people in the north of Thailand, and to commemorate the contributions of the king's mother, Princess Srinagarindra, known to her subjects as "Mae Fah Luang." From its inaugural class of 64 students in 1998, MFU has become Thailand's fastest growing post-secondary institution with an enrollment of just under 15,000 students.

Academics 
Mae Fah Luang University uses English as the medium of instruction.  Mae Fah Luang University manages all 15 faculties offering 38 undergraduate majors, 25 graduate degrees, and 15 professional degrees.

Faculty

References

Educational institutions established in 1998
Universities in Thailand
Buildings and structures in Chiang Rai province
Education in Chiang Rai province
1998 establishments in Thailand